Ben McDaniels (born June 6, 1980) is an American football coach who is the Wide receivers coach and passing game coordinator for the Houston Texans of the National Football League (NFL). He previously served as the quarterbacks coach for the University of Michigan and also previously serving as the interim wide receivers coach in late 2018. McDaniels previously served as the wide receivers coach for the Rutgers Scarlet Knights football team before being promoted to offensive coordinator after Ralph Friedgen decided to step down as OC after the season. McDaniels served as quarterback assistant with the Denver Broncos of the National Football League in 2010. He played collegiately as a quarterback at Kent State from 2000 to 2001.

Coaching career
McDaniels began his coaching career in 2003 as wide receivers coach at Warren G. Harding High School in Warren, Ohio. He then spent the next two years as a graduate assistant coach under head coach Glen Mason at the University of Minnesota.

McDaniels was named offensive coordinator and quarterbacks coach at Columbia University by head coach Pete Mangurian on December 29, 2011 but left for a position with the Tampa Bay Buccaneers less than 2 months later.

On February 12, 2016, McDaniels joined the Chicago Bears as an offensive quality control coach.

McDaniels returned to college football in 2018, joining the Michigan staff as an offensive analyst on the staff of head coach Jim Harbaugh.  On December 3, 2018, McDaniels was named wide receivers coach for Michigan's game against Florida in the 2018 Peach Bowl.  McDaniels took over the duties from Jim McElwain, who had recently assumed the head coaching position at Central Michigan.  On February 5, 2019, McDaniels was named Michigan's quarterbacks coach for the 2019 season. On March 10, 2021, McDaniels joined the Houston Texans as their assistant wide receivers coach and offensive assistant. On February 21, 2022, McDaniels was promoted to wide receivers coach and passing game coordinator.

Personal life
McDaniels is the son of Thom McDaniels (the 1997 USA Today High School Coach of the Year and often described as a "legend" of Ohio high school football).  He is the younger brother of former Denver Broncos' head coach and current Las Vegas Raiders' head coach Josh McDaniels.

McDaniels received a bachelor's degree in sport management from Kent State University and a master's degree in sport management from the University of Minnesota.

References

External links
Columbia profile

1980 births
Living people
American football quarterbacks
Kent State Golden Flashes football players
Minnesota Golden Gophers football coaches
Denver Broncos coaches
Columbia Lions football coaches
Houston Texans coaches
Tampa Bay Buccaneers coaches
Michigan Wolverines football coaches
Rutgers Scarlet Knights football coaches
Chicago Bears coaches
People from Barberton, Ohio
University of Minnesota alumni